Bernhard Süß (born 13 January 1961) is a German sports shooter. He competed in the men's 10 metre air rifle event at the 1984 Summer Olympics.

References

External links
 

1961 births
Living people
German male sport shooters
Olympic shooters of West Germany
Shooters at the 1984 Summer Olympics
People from Weilheim-Schongau
Sportspeople from Upper Bavaria